A turn is an element of secondary structure in proteins where the polypeptide chain reverses its overall direction.

Definition 

According to one definition, a turn is a structural motif where the Cα atoms of two residues separated by a few (usually 1 to 5) peptide bonds are close (less than ). The proximity of the terminal Cα atoms often correlates with formation of an inter main chain hydrogen bond between the corresponding residues. Such hydrogen bonding is the basis for the original, perhaps better known,  turn definition. In many cases, but not all, the hydrogen-bonding and Cα-distance definitions are equivalent.

Types of turns 

Turns are classified according to the separation between the two end residues:

 In an α-turn the end residues are separated by four peptide bonds (i → i ± 4).
 In a β-turn (the most common form), by three bonds (i → i ± 3).
 In a γ-turn, by two bonds (i → i ± 2).
 In a δ-turn, by one bond (i → i ± 1), which is sterically unlikely.
 In a π-turn, by five bonds (i → i ± 5).

Turns are classified by their backbone dihedral angles (see Ramachandran plot). A turn can be converted into its inverse turn (in which the main chain atoms have opposite chirality) by changing the sign on its dihedral angles. (The inverse turn is not a true enantiomer since the Cα atom chirality is maintained.) Thus, the γ-turn has two forms, a classical form with (φ, ψ) dihedral angles of roughly (75°, −65°) and an inverse form with dihedral angles (−75°, 65°). At least eight forms of the beta turn occur, varying in whether a cis isomer of a peptide bond is involved and on the dihedral angles of the central two residues. The classical and inverse β-turns are distinguished with a prime, e.g., type I and type I′ beta turns. If an i → i + 3 hydrogen bond is taken as the criterion for turns, the four categories of Venkatachalam  (I, II, II′, I′) suffice  to describe all possible beta turns. All four occur frequently in proteins but I is most common, followed by II, I′ and II′ in that order.

Loops
An ω-loop is a catch-all term for a longer, extended or irregular loop without fixed internal hydrogen bonding.

Multiple turns 
In many cases, one or more residues are involved in two partially overlapping turns. For example, in a sequence of 5 residues, both residues 1 to 4 and residues 2 to 5 form a turn; in such a case, one speaks of an  double turn. Multiple turns (up to sevenfold) occur commonly in proteins. Beta bend ribbons are a different type of multiple turn.

Hairpins 
A hairpin is a special case of a turn, in which the direction of the protein backbone reverses and the flanking secondary structure elements interact.  For example, a beta hairpin connects two hydrogen-bonded, antiparallel β-strands (a rather confusing name, since a β-hairpin may contain many types of turns – α, β, γ, etc.).

Beta hairpins may be classified according to the number of residues that make up the turn - that is, that are not part of the flanking β-strands. If this number is X or Y (according to two different definitions of β sheets) the β hairpin is defined as X:Y.

Beta turns at the loop ends of beta hairpins have a different distribution of types from the others; type I′ is commonest, followed by types II′, I and II.

Flexible linkers
Turns are sometimes found within flexible linkers or loops connecting protein domains. Linker sequences vary in length and are typically rich in polar uncharged amino acids. Flexible linkers allow connecting domains to freely twist and rotate to recruit their binding partners via protein domain dynamics.  They also allow their binding partners to induce larger scale conformational changes by long-range allostery

Role in protein folding 
Two hypotheses have been proposed for the role of turns in protein folding.  In one view, turns play a critical role in folding by bringing together and enabling or allowing interactions between regular secondary structure elements. This view is supported by mutagenesis studies indicating a critical role for particular residues in the turns of some proteins.  Also, nonnative isomers of X−Pro peptide bonds in turns can completely block the conformational folding of some proteins.  In the opposing view, turns play a passive role in folding.  This view is supported by the poor amino-acid conservation observed in most turns.  Also, non-native isomers of many X−Pro peptide bonds in turns have little or no effect on folding.

Beta turn prediction methods 
Over the years, many beta turn prediction methods have been developed. Recently, Dr. Raghava's Group developed BetaTPred3 method which predicts a complete beta turn rather than individual residues falling into a beta turn. The method also achieves good accuracy and is the first method which predicts all 9 types of beta turns. Apart from prediction, this method can also be used to find the minimum number of mutations required to initiate or break a beta turn in a protein at a desired location.

See also 
 Secondary structure
 beta turns

Notes

External links 
 BetaTPred3 - Insilico platform for predicting and initiating betaturns in a protein at desired location Article Link
NetTurnP - Prediction of Beta-turn regions in protein sequences
 BetaTPred - Prediction of Beta Turns in proteins using statistical algorithms

References 
These references are ordered by date.
 
 
 
 
 
 
 
 
 
 
 
 
 

Protein structural motifs